Ground Equipment Facility J-31 (San Pedro Hill Air Force Station during the Cold War) is a Joint Surveillance System radar site of the Western Air Defense Sector (WADS) and the Federal Aviation Administration's air traffic control radar network  for the Los Angeles Air Route Traffic Control Center.   The facility's Air Route Surveillance Radar Model 1E with an ATCBI-6 beacon interrogator system are operated by the FAA  and provide sector data to North American Aerospace Defense Command.  The site provided Semi-Automatic Ground Environment data to the 1959-66 Norton AFB Direction Center for the USAF Los Angeles Air Defense Sector.  The site also provided Project Nike data to the 1960-74 Fort MacArthur Direction Center ~ away for the smaller US Army Los Angeles Defense Area—as well as gap-filler radar coverage for the 1963-74 Integrated Fire Control area of Malibu Nike battery LA-78  on San Vicente Mountain.

History
The "ADC/FAA joint-use facility" began operations in 1961 with an FAA ARSR-1C radar.  After the April 1, 1961, move of the 670th Radar Squadron (SAGE)--formerly the 670th AC&W Squadron—from San Clemente Island Air Force Station, the Los Angeles Air Defense Sector was activated June 1.  The squadron was assigned to the "Fort MacArthur AI" (Army Installation) and operated the San Pedro Hill radars which included a General Electric AN/FPS-6B Radar and an Avco AN/FPS-26 Radar for height finding.  In 1964, the station's Westinghouse AN/FPS-27 Radar was installed (removed 1969) and the AN/FPS-6B was modified to an AN/FPS-90.  In April 1976 the squadron was redesignated Detachment 1 of Luke AFB's 26th Air Defense Squadron (the AN/FPS-26A was removed in this time frame).

The radar station with 18 military & 5 civilians was planned for transfer after the 1978 Base Realignment and Closure Commission.  After the station transferred to the FAA when Aerospace Defense Command was inactivated, the Air Force continued to operate the AN/FPS-90 height-finder by then modified to an AN/FPS-116 (removed c. 1988). In the late 1990s, the Air Force terminated the data-tie at San Pedro Hill and established a data-tie with the new Navy-installed ARSR-4 radar at San Clemente Island's Mount Thirst.  The Raytheon ARSR-1E Radar at San Pedro Hill was in use by November 2010.

References

Semi-Automatic Ground Environment sites
Formerly Used Defense Sites in California
Federal Aviation Administration
History of Los Angeles
Joint Surveillance System radar stations
Military facilities in Greater Los Angeles
1960 in military history
1960 establishments in California
1997 in military history
1997 disestablishments in California